Zlatko Tripić (born 2 December 1992) is a Norwegian-Bosnian footballer who plays as a winger for Viking FK.

Club career
Tripić was born in Rijeka, Croatia to Bosnian parents. When he was 9 months old, he moved to Norway with his parents and grew up in Lyngdal, playing youth football for Lyngdal IL. During his youth he attended a lot of Start's home matches. He moved to Sirdal in August 2008, and spent the next three years as student at Sirdal VGS fotball. At the same time he joined Tonstad IL, playing league football for their first team at the sixth tier of the Norwegian football league pyramid. In his last match for Tonstad, at an indoor tournament, Tripic scored the winner goal when Tonstad beat Egersund IK by 2–1 in the final. Egersund, playing at level 3, was impressed by young Tripic, and signed him only two months later. Here, he played an instrumental role as his club pushed for promotion, going top of their league in early June after Tripic scored a goal direct from a free-kick against fellow promotion chasers Brodd.

After an impressive display against Viking in a 2011 Norwegian Football Cup first-round tie, he made headlines in several Norwegian newspapers. It was thought that Viking would be his next career stop, but in a hectic summer, where he had trials at both Strømsgodset and Molde, his move to Molde was completed in August 2011 for an undisclosed fee. He only made 11 league appearances for Egersund during the four months he stayed with the club.

He made his debut in Tippeligaen for Molde, coming on as a late substitute in a 2–1 win against Start before he had even trained with his new teammates. The club became league champions in late October.

The next year, Tripic was loaned out to Fredrikstad FK for the last part of the 2012 season, following Etzaz Hussain's transfer the other way around.

After the 2014 season had ended, Tripic moved to German 2. Bundesliga side Greuther Fürth, signing a contract until 2017.

On 3 August 2017, Tripic signed for FC Sheriff Tiraspol.

On 21 February 2018, after his contract with Sheriff Tiraspol had been terminated, Tripić signed for Viking. In 2019, he led the club to the 2019 Norwegian Cup Final as captain. He scored the lone goal in the final, as Viking defeated Haugesund 1–0.

On 15 January 2020, Tripić signed for Turkish Süper Lig side Göztepe. On 3 May 2021, his contract with Göztepe was terminated by mutual consent.

On 7 May 2021, he returned to his former club Viking, signing a five-year contract.

International career
Tripic made his debut for Norway U21 in a friendly match against Netherlands U21 on 11 October 2012.

Career statistics

Honours
Molde
 Tippeligaen: 2011, 2012
 Norwegian Football Cup: 2013

Sheriff Tiraspol
 Moldovan National Division: 2017

Viking
 1. divisjon: 2018
 Norwegian Football Cup: 2019

References

External links
 
 Profile for Egersunds IK

1992 births
Living people
Footballers from Rijeka
Croatian emigrants to Norway
People from Lyngdal
Norwegian people of Croatian descent
Association football wingers
Norwegian footballers
Norway under-21 international footballers
Egersunds IK players
Molde FK players
Fredrikstad FK players
IK Start players
SpVgg Greuther Fürth players
FC Sheriff Tiraspol players
Viking FK players
Göztepe S.K. footballers
Eliteserien players
2. Bundesliga players
Regionalliga players
Moldovan Super Liga players
Norwegian First Division players
Süper Lig players
Norwegian expatriate footballers
Expatriate footballers in Germany
Expatriate footballers in Moldova
Expatriate footballers in Turkey
Norwegian expatriate sportspeople in Germany
Norwegian expatriate sportspeople in Moldova
Norwegian expatriate sportspeople in Turkey